Cara Hunter MLA (born 8 November 1995) is an Irish Social Democratic and Labour Party (SDLP) politician, currently serving as a Member of the Northern Ireland Assembly (MLA) for  East Londonderry, a position she has held since 18 May 2020.

Early life

Hunter grew up in the Causeway Coast and Tyrone area and then moved to the United States at nine years old, attending Simi Valley High School in California and studying broadcast journalism at California State University, Northridge. She completed her degree at Liverpool John Moores University.

Hunter was crowned Miss Intercontinental 2017, becoming the first contestant from Northern Ireland to win the beauty pageant, after entering it to honour a close friend who committed suicide at the age of 20. As pageant titleholder, she served as an ambassador for Me4Mental, a mental health charity in Derry.

Career
Hunter was elected to Derry City and Strabane District Council on 2 May 2019 and was elected Deputy Mayor of Derry.

Hunter stood unsuccessfully in East Londonderry at the December 2019 general election. She was coopted to the Northern Ireland Assembly after the death of John Dallat in May 2020. She is the SDLP's mental health spokesperson.

Hunter was the target of a harassment campaign during the 2022 Northern Ireland Assembly election, in which a pornographic clip, falsely claimed as featuring Hunter, was circulated on social media. Hunter received abusive and sexually explicit messages from men as a result. She described the as an "intimidation tactic" to make her feel embarrassed and humiliated.

Personal life 
In October 2021, Hunter revealed that she had been diagnosed with a brain tumour on her first day at Stormont, saying that her condition was not "life-threatening" but "life-altering".

References

External links

1995 births
Living people
Social Democratic and Labour Party MLAs
Northern Ireland MLAs 2017–2022
Politicians from County Londonderry
Members of Derry City and Strabane District Council
Social Democratic and Labour Party councillors
California State University, Northridge alumni
Alumni of Liverpool John Moores University
Women councillors in Northern Ireland
Irish beauty pageant winners